Hannu Olavi Mikkola (24 May 1942 − 25 February 2021) was a Finnish champion world rally driver. He was a seven-time winner of the 1000 Lakes Rally in Finland and won the RAC Rally in Great Britain four times.

Career 

Mikkola's rally career spanned 31 years, starting with a Volvo PV544 in 1963, but his most successful period was during the 1970s and 1980s.  The 1970s saw Mikkola a frontrunner in many international events, usually in a Ford Escort. He became the first overseas driver to win the East African Safari Rally in 1972, partnered by Gunnar Palm and again in a Ford Escort. In 1979 he made a serious challenge at the World Rally Championship title, ultimately finishing runner-up, only one point behind champion Björn Waldegård.

Mikkola was joined by Swedish co-driver Arne Hertz in 1977 and the pair were very quickly a force to be reckoned with, winning the British Rally Championship in 1978 in an Escort. The Mikkola/Hertz partnership lasted for thirteen years, through to the end of the 1990 season. He was partnered by Johnny Johansson for the 1991 season.

Mikkola was runner-up again in the 1980 season with Ford, but switched to the new Audi factory team for the 1981 season, to drive the revolutionary four wheel drive Audi Quattro. The partnership was successful from the outset: Mikkola led the 1981 Monte Carlo Rally, the Audi's first event, until an accident put him out of the event. He convincingly won the next WRC event, the Swedish Rally, but the Quattro had problems with reliability, and despite another win on the RAC Rally, Mikkola only managed third in the driver's championship.  He won the 1000 Lakes and RAC rallies the following year, but did not improve on third position in the championship, ultimately finishing behind Opel's Walter Röhrl and teammate Michèle Mouton.

1983 was to be Mikkola's year. Four wins and three second places saw him and co-driver Arne Hertz finally take the World Championship title. With that, he until this day is the oldest rally world champion. A second place in the championship followed in 1984, behind his teammate Stig Blomqvist, but 1985 saw him compete in only four world rallies, with three retirements and a fourth place, and slip to 22nd in the final standings after the Audi team was overwhelmed by new Group B competition from Peugeot and Lancia. Mikkola remained with Audi until the 1987 season, winning the Safari Rally in a Group A Audi 200 that year, before switching to Mazda.

He remained with Mazda until entering semi-retirement in 1991, although he continued to make sporadic appearances on international rallies until retiring completely from motorsport in 1993. Mikkola has made brief appearances since then, including re-uniting with his co-driver Gunnar Palm for the 25th anniversary run of the 1970 London to Mexico World Cup Rally (Mikkola won the original 1970 event and the 1995 re-run) and competing in the London-Sydney Marathon 2000 Rally, re-united with his 1968 1000 Lakes Rally winning Ford Escort RS1600 and co-driven by his oldest son, Juha Mikkola, founder of Canada Cup (floorball).

In September 2008, Mikkola took part in the Colin McRae Forest Stages Rally, a round of the Scottish Rally Championship. He was one of a number of former world champions to take part in the event in memory of McRae, who died in 2007. In 2011, Mikkola was inducted into the Rally Hall of Fame along with Röhrl.

Mikkola died on 25 February 2021 of cancer at the age of 78.

WRC victories 
{|class="wikitable"
!   #  
! Event
! Season
! Co-driver
! Car
|-
| 1
|  1000 Lakes Rally
| 1974
| John Davenport
| Ford Escort RS1600
|-
| 2
|  Rallye du Maroc
| 1975
| Jean Todt
| Peugeot 504
|-
| 3
|  1000 Lakes Rally
| 1975
| Atso Aho
| Toyota Corolla
|-
| 4
|  RAC Rally
| 1978
| Arne Hertz
| Ford Escort RS1800
|-
| 5
|  Rallye de Portugal Vinho do Porto
| 1979
| Arne Hertz
| Ford Escort RS1800
|-
| 6
|  Rally of New Zealand
| 1979
| Arne Hertz
| Ford Escort RS1800
|-
| 7
|  RAC Rally
| 1979
| Arne Hertz
| Ford Escort RS1800
|-
| 8
|  Rallye Côte d'Ivoire
| 1979
| Arne Hertz
| Mercedes 450 SLC 5.0
|-
| 9
|  Swedish Rally
| 1981
| Arne Hertz
| Audi Quattro
|-
| 10
|  RAC Rally
| 1981
| Arne Hertz
| Audi Quattro
|-
| 11
|  1000 Lakes Rally
| 1982
| Arne Hertz
| Audi Quattro
|-
| 12
|  RAC Rally
| 1982
| Arne Hertz
| Audi Quattro
|-
| 13
|  Swedish Rally
| 1983
| Arne Hertz
| Audi Quattro A1
|-
| 14
|  Rallye de Portugal Vinho do Porto
| 1983
| Arne Hertz
| Audi Quattro A1
|-
| 15
|  Rally Argentina
| 1983
| Arne Hertz
| Audi Quattro A2
|-
| 16
|  1000 Lakes Rally
| 1983
| Arne Hertz
| Audi Quattro A2
|-
| 17
|  Rallye de Portugal Vinho do Porto
| 1984
| Arne Hertz
| Audi Quattro A2
|-
| 18
|  Safari Rally
| 1987
| Arne Hertz
| Audi 200 Quattro
|}

Racing record

Complete WRC results

Complete British Saloon Car Championship results
(key) (Races in bold indicate pole position; races in italics indicate fastest lap.)

Trivia 

Hannu Mikkola was involved in the only international rally to end in a dead heat. On the 1978 Burmah International, Mikkola and Russell Brookes finished equal on total stage times, but Mikkola won the event by virtue of having been faster than Brookes on the opening stage.

References

External links 
 RallyBase profile
 WRC Archive stats page
 Hannu Mikkola documentary (in Swedish) Ögonblicken som förändrade sporten

1942 births
2021 deaths
World Rally Champions
World Rally Championship drivers
Finnish rally drivers
People from Joensuu
Deaths from cancer in Finland
Sportspeople from North Karelia
Audi Sport drivers